The men's high jump at the 2017 World Championships in Athletics was held at the Olympic Stadium on 11 and 13 August.

Summary
After winning Olympic gold, then setting the world decathlon best in the high jump, defending champion Derek Drouin (CAN) could not return due to a nagging injury.  Olympic silver medalist Mutaz Essa Barshim (BHR) was perfect through the automatic qualifier in the preliminaries and up to 2.29 m in the final.  Danil Lysenko, competing as an Authorised Neutral Athlete and Majd Eddin Ghazal (SYR), who trains in war ravaged Damascus both cleared with one miss.  Both Edgar Rivera (MEX)	and Mateusz Przybylko (GER) cleared on their final attempt to stay alive, while returning silver medalist and Olympic bronze medalist Bohdan Bondarenko (UKR) passed the height.

At 2.32 m Barshim remained perfect, while Lysenko also cleared on his first attempt.  Nobody else was able to clear, leaving Ghazal with the bronze.  At  Barshim again remained perfect, while Lysenko couldn't get over a new personal best, leaving him with silver, Barshim a perfectly clean competition to the gold medal.  Barshim moved the bar up to 2.40 m when he finally missed three times.

Records
Before the competition records were as follows:

No records were set at the competition.

Qualification standard
The standard to qualify automatically for entry was 2.30 metres.

Schedule
The event schedule, in local time (UTC+1), is as follows:

Results

Qualification
The qualification round took place on 11 August, in two groups, both starting at 11:15. Athletes attaining a mark of at least 2.31 metres ( Q ) or at least the 12 best performers ( q ) qualified for the final. The overall results were as follows:

Final
The final took place on 13 August at 19:00. The results were as follows:

References

High jump
High jump at the World Athletics Championships